Godiabandha is a small village located in the Indian state of Odisha in the Rayagada district. Aga Soura of Godiabandha was one of the tribal activists who supported the bhoodan movement in Koraput district by forming bhoo samaj.

Culture 
It happens to be the birthplace of  Arjuna Gamang, the founder of Divyadarshan Sangh  Dr.Giridhara Gamang (Ex-M.P. of I.N.C.), one of the  former chief ministers of Odisha was born at Dibirisingi, a village very close to the village Godiabandha. Oriya and Telugu are the commonly used languages in the village. Most of the people are Hindus. The nearby villages of the area are populated with scheduled caste and scheduled tribe people like saura etc.

Demography 
Godiabandha village is about 51 km towards east of the district headquarters and 240 km away from the state capital Bhubaneswar. There is no direct rail or air  communication to Gudiabandha. The nearest airport is Bhubaneswar and the nearest railway station is Gunupur. One can reach Gudiabandha via Rayagada by Odisha State Road Transport Corporation buses or private buses.

Educational institutions
 Govt. Upgraded U.P School, Godiabandha
 Basantidevi Bidyapitha, Godiabandha

References

External links
Official website of Rayagada district

Villages in Rayagada district